Rolling Thunder may refer to:

Arts

Film
Rolling Thunder (film), a 1977 film starring William Devane
Rolling Thunder (1996 film), a film produced by Gary Adelson
Rolling Thunder Pictures, a film distribution company
Rolling Thunder Revue: A Bob Dylan Story by Martin Scorsese, a 2019 pseudo-documentary film

Music
Rolling Thunder Revue, Bob Dylan's 1975–1976 musical tour 
The Bootleg Series Vol. 5: Bob Dylan Live 1975, The Rolling Thunder Revue, a live album recorded during the tour
Rolling Thunder (album), an album by Mickey Hart
"Rolling Thunder" (march), a march written by Henry Fillmore
"Rolling Thunder", a song by A-ha from East of the Sun, West of the Moon

Other
Rolling Thunder (journal), an anarchist periodical
Rolling Thunder (novel), a novel by John Varley
Rolling Thunder, a comics publishing company operated by Dave Dorman

Sports, games and amusements
Rolling Thunder (video game), a side-scrolling action video game by Namco originally released in 1986
Rolling Thunder (roller coaster), at Six Flags Great Adventure
Rolling Thunder skate park, in London
Rolling Thunder (Strongman), an athletic event
Rolling Thunder, a professional wrestling attack
Rolling Thunder Cyclocross Race, a cycling event

Other uses
Operation Rolling Thunder, a U.S. bombing campaign during the Vietnam War
Rolling Thunder (organization), a U.S. MIA/POW organization
Rolling Thunder (person), John Pope (1916–1997), a hippie spiritual leader
Rolling Thunder Mountain, Wyoming, U.S.

See also
Thunder (disambiguation)